Florida's 17th congressional district is an electoral district for the U.S. Congress, located in Southwest Florida. In the 2020 redistricting cycle, the district was shrunk to only include the coastal counties of Sarasota and Charlotte as well as northeastern Lee County, including most of Lehigh Acres. Other inland counties which were previously in the district were instead redistricted into the new 18th district.

From 2003 to 2013 it was located in South Florida, and was a majority African American district. It included the southern parts of Broward County and the eastern parts of Miami-Dade County. Included within the district were Pembroke Pines, Hollywood, Miramar, and North Miami. Most of this district is now the 24th District.

After the 2010 census and its corresponding redistricting cycle, the district included portions of the previous 12th and 16th Districts. Most of the district's territory came from the western portion of the old 16th. After court-ordered redistricting for the 2016 elections, the district included a large area of central Florida from eastern Tampa Bay to the western shores of Lake Okeechobee, including all of Charlotte County, DeSoto County, Glades County, Hardee County, Highlands County and Okeechobee County, plus parts of Lee County, Polk County and Sarasota County. Major cities in the district included North Port, Punta Gorda, Venice, Wauchula, Arcadia, and Okeechobee.

Republican Tom Rooney, incumbent congressman of the previous 16th district, ran for reelection in the 17th in 2012 and won. He was re-elected in 2014 and 2016, but did not run for re-election in 2018. Greg Steube was elected on November 6.

History 
The 17th district was created as a result of the redistricting cycle after the 1980 Census.

Recent results in presidential races

List of members representing the district

Election results

2002

2004

2006

2008

2010

2012

2014

2016

2018

2020

2022

References

External links

 Congressional Biographical Directory of the United States 1774–present

17